The Fuyang–Lu'an railway is an electrified single-track railway line in China.

The line has one passenger station, Huoqiu.

History
Construction of the line began on 10 August 2009. It was opened on 28 December 2013. Passenger service was introduced on 2 July 2014.

References

Railway lines in China
Railway lines opened in 2013